William Harrison Thomas (born August 13, 1968) is a former American football linebacker for the NFL's Philadelphia Eagles (1991–1999) and Oakland Raiders (2000–2001) franchises.

Thomas attended Palo Duro High School and later played college football at Texas A&M University. After college, the Philadelphia Eagles selected Thomas in the fourth round, 104th overall in the 1991 NFL Draft. He played for the Eagles in nine NFL seasons. His most notable seasons were in 1995 and 1996 which he was selected as a member of the NFC's Pro Bowl team. After his Eagles contract expired, Thomas signed with the Oakland Raiders which were coached by former Eagles assistant, Jon Gruden.

William Thomas ended his career with 37 sacks and 27 interceptions and is a member of the 20/20 Club. He was also known as an exceptional pass-coverage linebacker during his career.

Thomas was a member of the coaching staff at La Salle University as a volunteer assistant during the 2007 season.

Now resides in the southern New Jersey area with his wife and three sons. As of 2021 he is now divorced and resides in Pennsylvania.

References

External links

1968 births
American football linebackers
Living people
National Conference Pro Bowl players
Oakland Raiders players
Sportspeople from Amarillo, Texas
Palo Duro High School alumni
Philadelphia Eagles players
Texas A&M Aggies football players
Players of American football from Texas